The 2017–18 Florida Gators women's basketball team represented the University of Florida in the sport of basketball during the 2017–18 NCAA Division I women's basketball season. The Gators competed in Division I of the National Collegiate Athletic Association (NCAA) and the Southeastern Conference (SEC). The Gators, led by first-year head coach Cameron Newbauer, played their home games in the O'Connell Center on the university's Gainesville, Florida campus. They finished the season 11–19, 3–13 in SEC play to finish in a 3 tie for eleventh place. They lost in the first round of the SEC women's tournament to Ole Miss.

Previous season
The Gators finished the season 15–16, 5–11 in SEC play to finish in a tie for eleventh place. They advanced to the second round of SEC women's tournament where they lost to Texas A&M.

On March 6, the school fired Amanda Butler. She finished at Florida with a 10-year record of 190–136.

Roster

Coaches

Schedule and results

|-
!colspan=12 style="background:#0021A5; color:#FFFFFF;"| Non-conference regular season

|-
!colspan=12 style="background:#0021A5; color:#FFFFFF;"| SEC regular season

|-
!colspan=12 style="text-align: center; background:#0021A5"|SEC Women's Tournament

Source:

See also
 2017–18 Florida Gators men's basketball team

References

Florida Gators women's basketball seasons
Florida
Florida Gators
Florida Gators